Totopitk is a populated place situated in Maricopa County, Arizona, United States. Totopitk is an O'odham word meaning "crooked" or "lopsided". Historically, it has been known by a plethora of names, including Tauabit, Tautabit, Toapit, Totabit, Toto-Bitk, Totobit, Totobit Tanks, and Totobitk. The name Totopitk became official as a result of a decision of the Board on Geographic Names in 1941.

References

Populated places in Maricopa County, Arizona